Rhinella ocellata is a species of toad in the family Bufonidae.
It is endemic to Brazil.
Its natural habitats are moist savanna, subtropical or tropical moist shrubland, subtropical or tropical high-altitude shrubland, rivers, intermittent rivers, freshwater marshes, and intermittent freshwater marshes.
It is threatened by habitat loss.

References

ocellata
Endemic fauna of Brazil
Amphibians of Brazil
Taxonomy articles created by Polbot
Amphibians described in 1858
Taxa named by Albert Günther